Achrimsdale is a village in Highland, Scotland.

References

Populated places in Sutherland